Jethro Soutar is an English writer and translator, specializing mainly in Spanish and Portuguese literature.

Selected works 
Latin American culture (non-fiction):

 Ronaldinho: Football’s Flamboyant Maestro 
 Gael García Bernal and the Latin American New Wave
Translations include:
 Needle in a Haystack by Ernesto Mallo (Argentina)
 Hotel Brasil by Frei Betto (Brazil)
 By Night the Mountain Burns by Juan Tomás Ávila Laurel (Equatorial Guinea)
 The Madwoman of Serrano by Dina Salústio (Cabo Verde)

He has also co-edited The Football Crónicas, a football-themed writing from Latin America. His work has appeared in Granta, the Guardian, the Independent and Words Without Borders.

References

English translators
Year of birth missing (living people)
Living people